Yoshino Dam  is a gravity dam located in Kochi Prefecture in Japan. The dam is used for power production. The catchment area of the dam is 343.4 km2. The dam impounds about 32  ha of land when full and can store 2091 thousand cubic meters of water. The construction of the dam was started on 1951 and completed in 1953.

See also
List of dams in Japan

References

Dams in Kōchi Prefecture